Shine on, Harvey Moon is a British television series made by Witzend Productions and Central Television for ITV from 8 January 1982 to 23 August 1985 and briefly revived in 1995 by Meridian Broadcasting.

This generally light-hearted series was created by comedy writers Laurence Marks and Maurice Gran. The series is set in the East End of London shortly after the Second World War. On being demobbed RAF serviceman Harvey Moon, played by Kenneth Cranham, returns home and finds his family involved in various troubles. His wife Rita, played by Maggie Steed, is not interested in resuming their relationship and works in a seedy nightclub frequented by American servicemen. He becomes involved with the Labour Party and campaigns against the local Hackney branch of the far right Union Movement, after his mother expresses support for the UM albeit briefly.

The name of the series is a wordplay on the title of the popular 1908 song "Shine On, Harvest Moon!" The first series was commissioned and recorded by ATV (the forerunner to Central Television) at their Elstree studios, with the second series recorded in the same studios under the ownership of Central Television and with the remaining series filmed at Central's new facilities in Nottingham.

Regular cast
 Frieda Gottlieb – Suzanne Bertish
 Harvey Moon – Kenneth Cranham and Nicky Henson
 Erich Gottlieb – Leonard Fenton
 Lou Lewis – Nigel Planer
 Veronica – Pauline Quirke
 Maggie Moon – Linda Robson
 Violet "Nan" Moon – Elizabeth Spriggs
 Rita Moon – Maggie Steed
 Harriet Wright – Fiona Victory
 Stanley Moon – Lee Whitlock

The series was revived by Meridian Television in 1995, this time set during the 1950s, with Nicky Henson taking over the role of Harvey. It also brought in a new regular character, Noah Hawksley, played by Colin Salmon, an old friend of Harvey's who was facing racial prejudice.

DVD releases
Three 3-disc DVD box sets have been released by Acorn Media UK. The first comprises all episodes from series 2 and selected episodes from series 1 and the other, released in 2007, contains all episodes of series 3.
In 2012 a three disc set was released containing all episodes of series 4.

References

External links
 .

ITV comedy-dramas
ITV television dramas
1982 British television series debuts
1995 British television series endings
1980s British drama television series
1990s British drama television series
Television series by Fremantle (company)
Television series by ITV Studios
Television series set in the 1940s
Television series set in the 1950s
English-language television shows
Television shows produced by Central Independent Television
Television shows produced by Meridian Broadcasting
Television shows set in London
Union Movement
Television shows shot at ATV Elstree Studios